The Volvo V90 is a mid-size luxury wagon manufactured and marketed by Swedish automaker Volvo Cars since 2016. Two months after the introduction of the sedan model, the V90 was revealed at the Geneva Motor Show in March 2016. Its sedan variant is called the Volvo S90.

Models

V90 
The V90 is offered with various trim levels. In the United States the V90 was only available by special order, with dealers focusing on the V90 Cross Country.

In 2021, it was announced that the V90 would no longer be sold in the United States, starting with the 2022 model year.

V90 Cross Country 

Previewed before the 2016 Paris motor show, the V90 Cross Country is a raised height, AWD version of the V90 designed for use on rough terrain, unsealed roads and for light off-road usage.

V90 Cross Country Ocean Race 
A special version of the V90 Cross Country was announced 30 October 2017 to celebrate the 2017–18 Volvo Ocean Race.
The car has unique orange touches on the front and rear bumper, carbon fibre interior trim and orange stitching and seams and seat belts. It also has a detachable flashlight mounted in the trunk.

In the US market 84 were sold in total (41 as 2018 models, and 43 as 2019 models). In addition, of those sold in the US, 7 had the integrated rear child booster seats for the 2018 model year, and only 1 for the 2019 model year.

Facelift
In February 2020, the official photos of a refreshed V90 were leaked along with the refreshed S90. The Taillights had a sequential LED & Inscription variants get chrome garnish on front bumper.

Engines 
The V90 is only available with 2.0-litre, 4 cylinder petrol and diesel engines from the VEA family (Drive-E). The more powerful petrol engines are compound charged, as is the plug-in hybrid variant called the T8. The D5 diesel engine features Volvo's new PowerPulse technology that is designed to eliminate turbo lag as well as an i-Art injection system.

Notes

References 

V90
Station wagons
Plug-in hybrid vehicles
Front-wheel-drive vehicles
All-wheel-drive vehicles
Cars introduced in 2016